Labracinus is a genus of ray-finned fishes from the subfamily Pseudochrominae, which is one of four subfamilies in the dottyback family Pseudochromidae. They are found in the tropical western Pacific Ocean.

Species
There are three species in the genus:

 Labracinus atrofasciatus (Herre, 1933) (Blackbarred dottyback)
 Labracinus cyclophthalmus (J.P. Müller & Troschel, 1849) (Fire-tail devil)
 Labracinus lineatus (Castelnau, 1875) (Lined dottyback)

References

Pseudochrominae